The 2003 Colchester Borough Council election took place on 1 May 2003 to elect members of Colchester Borough Council in Essex, England. This was the same day as the other 2003 United Kingdom local elections. One third of the seats were up for election and the council stayed under no overall control.

Background

Prior to the election, two sitting Labour councillors resigned from the party, leaving the Labour group with 4 seats. Don Quinn (St Andrew's) left the Labour group to sit as an Independent, whilst Phillip Hawkins (Wivenhoe Cross) resigned his seat after moving to Scotland.

Before the election the Conservatives were the largest party with 24 seats, the Liberal Democrats had 23 seats, Labour had 4 seats, there were 8 independents and 1 seat was vacant. The council was run by a cabinet comprising 3 Conservatives, 3 Liberal Democrats and 1 Labour members.

21 seats were being contested, with 2 seats available in Wivenhoe Cross due to the vacancy. The remaining 20 seats all had the sitting councillors defending their seats and included the Labour group leader Tim Young in St Andrew's and the Conservative mayor Nigel Chapman in Fordham and Stour. Meanwhile, in Highwoods, Ian Ringer, defended the seat as an independent after leaving the Liberal Democrats earlier in 2003.

Election result
Prior to the election, 3 Liberal Democrat councillors from Highwoods ward defected and sat as Independents, reducing the Liberal Democrat group to 23 councillors.

Before the election one seat was vacant in Wivenhoe Cross ward.

Ward results

Shown below are ward results according to the council's election results archive.

Three of the single-seat wards (Dedham & Langham, East Donyland, Marks Tey) were not up for election this year. Neither were three of the two-seat wards (Harbour, Lexden, St John's).

Berechurch

Birch & Winstree

Castle

Christ Church

Copford & West Stanway

Fordham & Stour

Great Tey

Highwoods

Mile End

New Town

Prettygate

St. Andrew's

St. Anne's

Shrub End

Stanway

Tiptree

West Bergholt & Eight Ash Green

No Green candidate as previous (14.8%).

West Mersea

Wivenhoe Cross

Wivenhoe Quay

By-elections

Wivenhoe Quay
A by-election took place on 22 April 2004 after the death of the independent councillor Richard Davies.

No Independent (35.9%) or Green (10.4%) candidates as previous.

References

2003 English local elections
2003
2000s in Essex